Bruce Henry Riutta (October 14, 1944 – January 24, 2012) was an American ice hockey player. He competed at the 1968 Winter Olympics. He was also a member of the U.S. national team at the 1969, 1970 and 1971 ice hockey world championship tournaments.

Awards and honors

References

External links
 

1944 births
2012 deaths
American men's ice hockey defensemen
Ice hockey players from Michigan
Ice hockey players at the 1968 Winter Olympics
Olympic ice hockey players of the United States
People from Hancock, Michigan
NCAA men's ice hockey national champions
AHCA Division I men's ice hockey All-Americans